Judge Ramirez may refer to:

Irma Carrillo Ramirez (born 1964), magistrate judge of the United States District Court for the Northern District of Texas
Raul Anthony Ramirez (born 1944), judge of the United States District Court for the Eastern District of California
Sergio García Ramírez (born 1938), Mexican jurist and judge of the Inter-American Court of Human Rights